Done by Mirrors is the second solo album of Andi Deris, vocalist of the power metal band Helloween. In Japan, it was released in 1999, but due to record company conflicts, had to be released in 2000 in the rest of the world. The sound is different from Helloween, and from the previous album, Come in from the Rain, with the dark thematic who would come in 2000 with Helloween's album The Dark Ride.

Track listing

All songs written by Andi Deris

"Let Your Love Fly Free" - 4:23
"Dangerous" - 3:37
"The Best You Don't Need to Pay For" - 3:50
"Harvest" - 1:18
"Free" - 3:11
"Did It All for You" - 4:22
"A Little Bit More Each Day" - 3:43
"I Don't Believe in the Good" - 3:25
"Patient" - 3:46
"Back Again" - 4:15
"Child of My Fear" - 3:32
"Do You Really Wanna Know" [Japanese Bonus Track] - 7:18

Credits

Band members
Andi Deris – vocals, guitars
Don Pupillo – guitars
Gisbert Royder – bass
Ralph Mason – drums, backing vocals, co-lead vocals on "Do You Really Wanna Know"

Additional musicians
 Benjamin Nauschütz - additional keyboards on "Do You Really Wanna Know"
 Diana Böge - additional backing vocals

1999 albums
Andi Deris albums
Massacre Records albums